The 2020 Formula 4 United States Championship season was the fifth season of the Formula 4 United States Championship, a motor racing series regulated according to FIA Formula 4 regulations and sanctioned by SCCA Pro Racing, the professional racing division of the Sports Car Club of America.

Teams and drivers 
All teams were American-registered.

Race calendar
The original series schedule was announced on 19 December 2019. After multiple postponements due to the 2019-20 coronavirus pandemic, on 29 May 2020 a new schedule was revealed that added new rounds at Mid-Ohio Sports Car Course and Homestead-Miami Speedway, but no longer included a round at Road Atlanta. The final round at Circuit of the Americas, which was supposed to be held in support of the 2020 United States Grand Prix until that event canceled, was held as a triple-header.

Championship standings

Points were awarded as follows:

Drivers' standings

Teams' standings

Notes

References

External links 
 

United States
United States F4 Championship seasons
F4 United States Championship
United States F4